Me and Earl and the Dying Girl is a 2015 American comedy-drama film directed by Alfonso Gomez-Rejon and written by Jesse Andrews, based on Andrews' 2012 eponymous debut novel. The film stars Thomas Mann, RJ Cyler and Olivia Cooke. It follows a socially awkward teen boy who befriends a classmate diagnosed with cancer, along with the former's friend. The film premiered at the 2015 Sundance Film Festival to a standing ovation. It received positive reviews from critics, who praised the screenplay and cast.

Plot
Seventeen-year-old Greg Gaines, who is self-described as having the face of a "little groundhog", is a senior at Pittsburgh's Schenley High School who avoids close engagement with other students. He learns that fellow student and former childhood friend of his, Rachel Kushner, has been diagnosed with leukemia and is forced by his parents to befriend her in her time of need. Despite an awkward first encounter on Rachel's staircase, with neither of them truly wanting the other's company, Greg manages to strike up a conversation about her pillow collection. She comes to find his quirky personality and honesty endearing.

Greg introduces Rachel to his "coworker" Earl (who tells Rachel that Greg avoids calling people his friend out of fear they won't reciprocate), with whom he makes short films parodying famous film titles. Despite Greg's reluctance, Earl shares their collection with her, which she finds entertaining. As Rachel begins her chemotherapy treatment and subsequently loses all of her hair, Greg begins spending less time on schoolwork and more time with and caring for her by entertaining her to lift her spirits. Though Rachel suffers through her treatment and seems to get worse and worse, Greg, who often breaks the fourth wall, assures viewers that she does not die in the end.

Madison, a pretty girl at school, convinces Greg and Earl to make a film dedicated to Rachel, and Rachel persuades Greg to apply to a local college. Greg continues to ignore schoolwork, and eventually school altogether, in order to finish the film. After realizing that her chemotherapy is doing more harm than good, Rachel opts to discontinue her treatment. Greg and Rachel have a heated argument over her choice where Greg accuses Rachel of giving up on herself and in return Rachel points out his unwillingness to do anything selfless unless he's told to do so. He leaves, devastated that he can no longer help her.

In a rage, Greg confronts Earl, blaming him for the events leading to the end of his friendship with Rachel. Earl in turn admonishes Greg's inability to care and sympathize for anyone but himself, before ultimately punching Greg after the latter dares him to. Later, Earl gives Greg a heartfelt testimonial for Rachel’s film before letting him know that he's finished with their friendship. Greg's admission to the college he planned to attend is later revoked due to his poor grades.

Later in the year, Greg learns that Rachel is back in the hospital and is dying. His mom encourages him to visit her. Madison invites Greg to the prom, but at the last moment, he decides to go to the hospital instead. During the journey there, Greg is asked by the limo driver if he loves the girl he's going to see, a question he finds himself unable to answer. He brings his iPhone and a portable projector and places a corsage around Rachel's wrist before running the film he made for her on the front wall of her room. Rachel is moved to tears by the movie, but falls into a coma shortly after viewing it and dies about 10 hours later. Greg admits to the viewer that he lied about Rachel not dying, as he "didn't think she would."

At her shiva, Greg is comforted by Rachel's mom and they grieve together. Greg and Earl rekindle their friendship. During the funeral, Greg sneaks into Rachel's room, where he finds a card from her stating that she wrote to Greg's college and explained that he missed school for her sake. It also states her wish for Greg to take any of her possessions that he pleases. He finds several intricate carvings within her books depicting scenes of her with Greg and Earl. Greg leaves with one of the books containing a personal carving and his favorite of Rachel's pillows.

Some time later, Greg writes his story of his time with Rachel and mails it to the college along with the film he made for her with a warning that "the last person who saw this immediately went into a coma and DIED."

Cast

 Thomas Mann as Greg Gaines
 Gavin Dietz as young Greg
RJ Cyler as Earl Jackson
 Edward DeBruce III as young Earl
 Olivia Cooke as Rachel Kushner
 Nick Offerman as Victor Gaines
 Molly Shannon as Denise Kushner
 Jon Bernthal as Mr. McCarthy
 Connie Britton as Marla Gaines
 Chelsea T. Zhang as Naomi
 Katherine C. Hughes as Madison
 Natalie Marchelletta as Anna
 Matt Bennett as Scott Mayhew
 Bobb'e J. Thompson as Derrick
 Hugh Jackman as Himself and Logan / Wolverine (voice)
 Karriem Sami as Limo Driver
 Marco Zappala as Theater Dork
 Etta Cox as Principal
 Masam Holden as Ill Phil
 Kaza Marie Ayersman as Rachel's Friend
 Cheryl Kline as Rabbi
 Joan Augustin as Elderly Mourner
 Mark Granatire as Testimonial Student #1
 Kayana White as Testimonial Student #2
 Linda Kanyarusoke as Testimonial Student #3
 Drew Palajsa as Testimonial Student #4
 Elly Silberstein as Testimonial Student #5
 Nicole Tubbs as Children's Hospital Nurse
 Arcade Matt Magnone as Toothy Goth

Production
Screenwriter Dan Fogelman decided to produce the film after reading a manuscript of the 2012 novel Me and Earl and the Dying Girl. The production company Indian Paintbrush and producers Steven M. Rales and Jeremy Dawson then got involved. Having never read or written a script before, Jesse Andrews adapted his own New York Times best-selling novel. Andrews' screenplay appeared on the 2012 Black List of Hollywood's best unproduced screenplays. Director Alfonso Gomez-Rejon became interested in the project after reading a leaked copy of the script. He had worked as a production assistant and second-unit director for Nora Ephron, Martin Scorsese and Alejandro González Iñárritu, and had been looking to direct his first personal film, to express his own cinematic vision and his grief for his late father.

The film was shot over a four-week period for an estimated budget of under $5 million. Principal photography  began on June 13, 2014, in Pittsburgh, Pennsylvania; they started filming high school scenes on June 16. Cinematographer Chung-hoon Chung shot the film digitally using Arri Alexa cameras with prime and anamorphic lenses in a widescreen 2.35:1 aspect ratio. A Pittsburgh native, writer Jesse Andrews' family home in Point Breeze was used as Greg's house in the film. Rachel's house was located in Squirrel Hill, and Earl's house was in Braddock. Other locations included Schenley High School (closed since 2008), The Andy Warhol Museum, Copacetic Comics in Polish Hill, and a street corner in West Oakland, which served as an ice cream shop. The Criterion Collection lent its library of classic films for use in the book-and-DVD store in the film.

Brian Eno scored the film using a combination of previously unreleased recordings and a few original compositions; Nico Muhly composed the music for the beginning high school sequence and final credits. Filmmakers Edward Bursch and Nathan O. Marsh made 21 stop motion animated and live-action short films to represent Greg and Earl's classic film parodies, including the final short film made for Rachel set to Brian Eno's "The Big Ship". Differing from the novel, director Gomez-Rejon felt the final film should reflect Greg's artistic growth and express his love for Rachel in an abstract way, using color, texture, and shapes, similar to the work of Stan Brakhage.

Release
Me and Earl and the Dying Girl premiered on January 25, 2015 at the 2015 Sundance Film Festival, to a standing ovation. The film was acquired by Fox Searchlight Pictures for $12 million in a bidding war hours after its premiere, and won the U.S. Grand Jury Prize: Dramatic and the Audience Award for U.S. Drama at the festival. On February 24, it was announced the film had been scheduled for a limited release on July 1, 2015 in the United States. On March 10, it was stated that the film would instead be released on June 12, 2015. The film had a gradual theatrical release, opening in 15 art house theaters, expanding to 68, and then to more than 350 screens. The film went wide to 870 theaters during the July Fourth holiday. It was released in the UK on September 4, 2015.

Home media
The film was released on video on demand on September 18, 2015, and DVD and Blu-ray on October 6, 2015. The DVD and Blu-ray include an audio commentary by the director, deleted scenes with optional commentary, the film made for Rachel, Greg's trailer, and a photo gallery. The Blu-ray also includes the featurette, This Is Where You Learn How the Movie Was Made, a conversation with Martin Scorsese and Gomez-Rejon, and a montage of Greg and Earl's short films.

Reception

The film has received positive reviews from critics. On Rotten Tomatoes, the film has a rating of 81%, based on 212 reviews, with an average of 7.60/10. The website's consensus reads "Beautifully scripted and perfectly cast, Me & Earl & the Dying Girl is a coming-of-age movie with uncommon charm and insight." The film has a score of 74 out of 100 on Metacritic, given by 40 critics, which indicates "generally favorable reviews".

Indiewire gave the film a grade of A−, describing it as "a beautifully charming, captivating knock-out". Peter Debruge of Variety wrote that the film "is destined not only to connect with young audiences in a big way, but also to endure as a touchstone for its generation". Pamela McClintock of The Hollywood Reporter later noted that the film had failed to crossover and connect with mainstream audiences, having grossed just $6.2 million in the 6 weeks after its release.

Accolades

References

External links

2015 films
2010s high school films
2010s buddy comedy-drama films
2015 romantic comedy-drama films
2010s teen comedy-drama films
2010s teen romance films
American films with live action and animation
American buddy comedy-drama films
American high school films
American romantic comedy-drama films
American teen comedy-drama films
American teen romance films
2010s English-language films
Films about cancer
Films about death
Films about filmmaking
Films based on American novels
Films based on young adult literature
Films directed by Alfonso Gomez-Rejon
2015 independent films
American independent films
Films set in Pittsburgh
Films shot in Pittsburgh
Indian Paintbrush (production company) films
Sundance Film Festival award winners
2010s American films